Ezgeleh (also Romanized as Asgaleh, Azgaleh; also known as Askīleh, Asqaīla, Asqaīleh, and Azgaleh-ye Sheykh Najm od Dīn) is a city and capital of Ezgeleh District, in Salas-e Babajani County, Kermanshah Province, Iran.  At the 2016 census, its population was 1,502, in 372 families.

References

Populated places in Salas-e Babajani County

Cities in Kermanshah Province